Following is a list of senators of Haute-Loire, people who have represented the department of Haute-Loire in the Senate of France.

Third Republic

Senators for Haute-Loire under the French Third Republic were:

 Balthazar Jacotin (1876–1878)
 Edmond du Motier de La Fayette (1876–1890)
 Ernest Vissaguet (1879–1920)
 Clément Allemand (1891–1900)
 Charles Dupuy (1900–1923)
 Louis Devins (1913–1917)
 Auguste Foulhy (1920–1924)
 Francisque Enjolras (1920–1933)
 Régis Martin-Binachon (1924–1938)
 Édouard Néron (1924–1940)
 Julien Fayolle (1933–1935)
 Laurent Eynac (1935–1940)
 Joseph Antier (1938–1940)

Fourth Republic

Senators for Haute-Loire under the French Fourth Republic were:

 Paul Chambriard (1946–1959)
 Jean de Lachomette (1948–1959)

Fifth Republic 
Senators for Haute-Loire under the French Fifth Republic:

References

Sources

 
Lists of members of the Senate (France) by department